Chinnakallar Falls is a waterfall in the Valparai taluk, Coimbatore district, in the Indian state of Tamil Nadu. A narrow trail among rugged bushes leads us to the waterfalls .The area where this waterfall located is the third-most wettest area or third-highest rainfall receiving place in India after Mawsynram and Cherrapunji.

A song in the Tamil film "Suryavamsam" of Sarath Kumar was filmed here to commemorate this waterfall. Coordinates:10°18'11"N 77•°1'47"E.

References

Waterfalls of Tamil Nadu
Coimbatore district